"Tuesday Afternoon" (sometimes referred to as "Forever Afternoon (Tuesday?)", or simply "Forever Afternoon") is a 1968 song written by Justin Hayward that was first released by English symphonic rock band the Moody Blues on their 1967 album Days of Future Passed and later released as a single.

Background
The song was originally released on The Moody Blues' 1967 album Days of Future Passed, a concept album chronicling a typical day. On the album, it was part one of "The Afternoon" track titled "Forever Afternoon (Tuesday?)". Justin Hayward said that he wrote the song on a Tuesday afternoon in Lypiatt Park, in western England near Stroud. Hayward's mother had taken him and his brother to the park while they were growing up, and he revisited the park during the production of Days of Future Passed to write the song.  He said that he wrote the song "with guitar and joint in hand."

Allmusic critic Richie Unterberger describes the lyrics as being "of a youthful contemplative sort coming to a philosophical realization that helps him get that much closer to the meaning of life."  According to Unterberger, the song has a "strong melody and a dignified presentation."  The instrumentation features a prominent Mellotron.

Justin Hayward wrote the song originally intending to name it "Tuesday Afternoon". At the insistence of producer Tony Clarke, it was named "Forever Afternoon (Tuesday?)" for its release on Days of Future Passed. However, when it was released as a single a year later, its name was changed back to "Tuesday Afternoon". Some of the Moody Blues compilation and live albums list the song as "Tuesday Afternoon (Forever Afternoon)" to reflect both titles.

"Tuesday Afternoon" was released as a single in 1968 and was the second single from Days of Future Passed (the first being "Nights in White Satin"). It was backed with another Days track, "Another Morning". 

On Days of Future Passed, the London Festival Orchestra performs the final orchestral rendition of the chorus. This orchestral link between parts one and two of the song was recorded separately from the Moodys' portions. The link was arranged by Peter Knight, who arranged orchestral sections for the entire album. However, for the single release and subsequent releases on compilation albums, this orchestral finale was not included and the song simply faded out during Ray Thomas's flute solo. The Moody Blues 1994 compilation album, Time Traveller, marked the first time the orchestral link was included on a compilation. Its release on 1998's Anthology also included the first-portion orchestral finale.

Reception
Cash Box said that this "Stunning teen-aimed ballad picks up rhythmic punch in a development that winds up a throbbing with top forty appeal."

Classic Rock History critic Brian Kachejian rated it as the Moody Blues' greatest song, saying that "Justin Hayward’s beautiful lyrics and melody combined with John Lodges’ guitar work and Mike Pinder’s Mellotron presented Moody Blues fans with the group’s grandest work and quite simply, the finest recording of the band’s long career."  Ultimate Classic Rock critic Nick DeRiso rated it as the Moody Blues' 4th greatest song.

Use in advertising
 In 2009, "Tuesday Afternoon" was included in a commercial for Visa's Check Card.  The commercial depicted a man taking his daughter to an aquarium on a Tuesday afternoon, and is narrated by actor Morgan Freeman.

Personnel
 Justin Hayward – lead vocal, acoustic guitar
 John Lodge – backing vocal, bass guitar
 Mike Pinder – Mellotron, piano
 Ray Thomas – flute
 Graeme Edge – drums, percussion
 Peter Knight and the London Festival Orchestra – orchestral arrangements

Chart history

Cover versions
 New-age piano player David Lanz recorded an instrumental version of "Tuesday Afternoon" for his album Songs from an English Garden.
 Jazz singer Bobbi Wilsyn performs "Tuesday Afternoon" on her album It's About Time.
 Northern Soul band The Senate covered "Tuesday Afternoon" on their L.P. Piper Club Dance
 Progrock singer/keyboardist Neal Morse covered "Tuesday Afternoon" on his album Cover To Cover
 Dutch 1960s–1970s band Etcetera Music Band covered "Tuesday Afternoon" and released it as a digital single in 2010.
 The Doughboys (New Jersey garage rockers) covered "Tuesday Afternoon" on their 2010 album Act Your Rage; their version was chosen to be "Coolest Song In The World" on Little Steven's Underground Garage show on Sirius/XM Satellite Radio.
 Turkish rock singer Erkin Koray covered this song with Turkish lyrics "Yine Yalnızım" in 1969.
 John Cowan covered the song on the album "Moody Bluegrass: A Nashville Tribute to Moody Blues"
 Morse/Portnoy/George recorded a version on their 2020 album Cover to Cover

References

External links
 
 
 

The Moody Blues songs
1968 singles
Songs written by Justin Hayward
1967 songs
Deram Records singles
British songs